Abdelmalek Benhabylès  (27 April 1921 – 28 December 2018) was an Algerian politician. He was born in Chevreuil. He was a chairman of the Constitutional Council from 11 January 1992 until 14 January 1992, thus was acting head of state when the military ousted Chadli Bendjedid. He received the 1st Class, Grand Cordon of Order of the Rising Sun on 17 December 2012.

A fervent nationalist, he was Minister of Justice from 1977 to 1979, and in the latter year was appointed Secretary General of the Republic. He was chair of the Ligue algérienne de défense des droits de l’homme (LADDH). He died on 28 December 2018 at the age of 97.

Honours 
National 
  Grand Master of the National Order of Merit
Foreign
  Grand Cordon of Order of the Rising Sun (Japan, 17 December 2012).

References 

1921 births
2018 deaths
People from Sétif Province
Algerian People's Party politicians
Movement for the Triumph of Democratic Liberties politicians
Members of the National Liberation Front (Algeria)
Presidents of Algeria
Grand Cordons of the Order of the Rising Sun
21st-century Algerian people
Justice ministers of Algeria